Phil Nibbelink (born June 3, 1955) is an American animator and film director as well as comic book writer and illustrator known for his work on films as the Academy Award-winning Who Framed Roger Rabbit and the 1991 cult animated sequel An American Tail: Fievel Goes West.

Career
Nibbelink worked for ten years at Disney and was a directing animator on Who Framed Roger Rabbit. Then he spent ten years working under Steven Spielberg as an animation director, working on films such as An American Tail: Fievel Goes West (which he co-directed with Simon Wells) and Casper as animation director.  He also directed an animated adaptation of the children's book We're Back! A Dinosaur's Story for Amblimation. He was originally scheduled to co-direct Balto with Wells, but production on We're Back! A Dinosaur's Story was incomplete, so Wells advised Nibbelink to continue working on We're Back! A Dinosaur's Story, while he set to work on Balto. Afterwards, Nibbelink began working with Dick and Ralph Zondag (with whom he and Wells had co-directed We're Back! A Dinosaur's Story) on the upcoming movie, Cats, until it was cancelled after Amblimation's founder and owner, Steven Spielberg, closed the studio in 1997 and co-founded DreamWorks Animation.

Later works
Nibbelink later turned his attention to independent filmmaking, cranking out not one but three full-length animated features single-handedly. These films would include Puss in Boots (1999) and Romeo & Juliet: Sealed with a Kiss (2006). He is the founder and owner of his company, Phil Nibbelink Productions. His most recent project is as storyboard artist on Wolverine and the X-Men.

Filmography
Wolverine and the X-Men (2008–2009) (storyboard artist)
Romeo & Juliet: Sealed with a Kiss (2006) (voice of Prince, director, producer, writer, editor, animator, background artist, songwriter)
Leif Ericson: The Boy Who Discovered America (2000) (director, writer, editor, animator, background artist)
The Iron Giant (1999) (supervising animator - uncredited)
Puss in Boots (1999) (director, writer, editor, animator, background artist, songwriter)
Boogie Woogie Whale Sing-Along (1997) (director, writer, animator)
Casper (1995) (animation director)
We're Back! A Dinosaur's Story (1993) (director)
The Magic Voyage (1992) (animation director, key animator, storyboard artist)
An American Tail: Fievel Goes West (1991) (director)
Oliver & Company (1988) (storyboard artist - uncredited)
Who Framed Roger Rabbit (1988) (directing animator, supervising animator)
The Great Mouse Detective (1986) (character animator)
The Black Cauldron (1985) (voice of Henchmen, character designer, character animator)
The Fox and the Hound (1981) (character animator)
Banjo the Woodpile Cat (1979) (animator: dogs) (uncredited)

External links

Rotten Tomatoes

References

American animators
Background artists
American film directors
American animated film directors
American male screenwriters
Living people
1955 births